Thomas Field (9 November 1855 – 20 May 1936) was a priest in the Church of England and most notable as an educational reformer, the headmaster of two major schools.

Life
He was born on 9 November 1855 to Thomas Field of Folkestone, a draper. Field was a distinguished Oxford "classic", he taught at Repton School and Harrow School from 1878 to 1886, and had been Headmaster of The King's School, Canterbury from 1886 to 1897, before becoming warden of Radley College 1897 to 1913.

He was described in those days as being tall, ponderous and swarthy, with a mighty chest and close cut black beard, a man of invincible energy, truly the picture of the Victorian Headmaster.

He had an elephantine memory, whose singing was an unmelodious roar. A tale is told of Field's days at Radley - that he was left, owing to a sudden conspiratorial silence, to blare forth alone - 'I am a worm and no man'. (Psalm 22:6)

He was ordained into the Church of England in 1880. He was appointed Vicar of St. Mary's Church, Nottingham on 28 July 1913 and he held this post until 1926. He was a Canon of Southwell Minster from 1913 until 1936. He died on 20 May 1936.

References

 Thomas Field DD A Memoir by H S Goodrich, SPCK 1937.

link
 1
23
 The History of Radley College 1847-1947

1855 births
1936 deaths
Vicars of St Mary's Church, Nottingham
19th-century English Anglican priests
20th-century English Anglican priests
Alumni of Corpus Christi College, Oxford
Fellows of Magdalen College, Oxford
Heads of schools in England